The Ivy Council is a non-profit organization of Ivy League student government leaders, student organization leaders, and students at-large. The Ivy Council was established in 1990 by members of the Ivy League student governments in order to facilitate effective communication between the student governments of their respective institutions and to provide a unified voice for the Ivy League student governments. On its 30th anniversary, the organization was restructured and expanded its focus beyond the eight Ivy League universities to better serve its new mission statement.

Establishment 
Founded in 1990 as a way to collaborate and exchange ideas on shared issues at their respective universities, student government leaders set the stage for the Ivy Council that exists today. The Ivy Council draws its membership from Harvard University, Columbia University, Princeton University, Yale University, the University of Pennsylvania, Brown University, Dartmouth College, and Cornell University.

Student leaders from the student governments of Columbia University (the Columbia College Student Council, the Columbia Engineering Student Council, and the Columbia General Studies Student Council), the Cornell University Student Assembly, the Dartmouth College Student Assembly, the Harvard University Undergraduate Council, the University of Pennsylvania Undergraduate Assembly, the Princeton University Undergraduate Student Government, the Yale College Council, and the Brown University Undergraduate Council of Students have also served on the Ivy Council.

Programs 
Beginning in 2020, the organization has expanded its offering of programs while maintaining its historical programs. Some of the new featured programs include the Ivy Ambassadors Initiative, Tech for Public Service, and the Ivy Scholars Initiative and Ivy Fellowship. The Ivy Council also hosts various conferences that bring together student leaders from across the Ivy League and from partner organizations. Since 2018 it has also run a program known as the Youth Development Goals (YDGs) as a platform to expand and enhance youth involvement in national and international politics. The Ivy Council has also been involved in the Youth 20 process of the G20 since 2016 and has been a leading voice of youth involvement in this forum.  

Ivy Leadership Congress (ILC) is an annual conference hosted by the Ivy Council to bring together students leaders from the eight Ivy League universities along with leaders from the business, government, academics, and non-profit sectors of society. The conference venue is rotated each year through the campuses of the schools in the Ivy League. ILC aims to promote the exchange of ideas between students of the Ivy League and today's leaders on subjects of public policy such as university safety and ethics in science and technology. Annually, eighty participants are selected from a pool of hundreds of applicants from throughout the Ivy League. Additionally, international student leaders and partner organizations are invited to offer global perspectives and deepen cooperations with the Ivy Council. The main activities of the conference are keynote speakers, panels, and roundtable discussions. Conferences conclude with an annual report of the Ivy Council, highlighting the achievements of the past year and charting the vision for the coming year. Past speakers have included Steve Forbes, Chairman and CEO of Forbes magazine; Nasreen Berwari, Iraqi Minister of Municipalities and General Works; Jeffrey Sachs, special adviser to the UN's Sustainable Development Goals; Theodore Roosevelt IV, Managing Director at Lehman Brothers and prominent environmentalist; Dov Zakheim, US Undersecretary of Defense; Dan Rosensweig, CEO of Chegg; Henry Blodget, CEO of Business Insider, and US Senator Cory Booker.

Partners 
The Ivy Council engages with a wide range of partners, including Ivy League student organizations, non-profits, and international organizations. Beyond the Ivy League, the Ivy Council has also partnered with universities it labels the Ivy+ as well as international institutional partners. Domestically, these have included UC Berkeley, UCLA, UCSD, Duke University, Stanford University, USC, Johns Hopkins University, the University of Chicago, George Washington University, Georgetown University, Vanderbilt University and others. Internationally, these have included the University of British Columbia (Canada), Soka University (Japan), Oxford University (United Kingdom), University of Cambridge (United Kingdom), the London School of Economics (United Kingdom), Sorbonne University (France), University of Copenhagen (Denmark), Bocconi University (Italy), University of Bologna (Italy), University of Milan (Italy), University of Amsterdam (Netherlands), University of Zurich (Switzerland), University of Buenos Aires (Argentina), Jawaharlal Nehru University (India), and Hong Kong University (Hong Kong SAR). The Ivy Council has relations institutional partners in over twenty five countries around the world.

Leadership 
Historically student delegates from each of the member schools maintained a Steering Committee for day-to-day operations. The Steering Committee consisted of Secretariat Heads and the Head Delegates of the eight member schools. Head Delegates were selected by the Steering Committee from the member institutions and were entrusted to represent their respective schools in the interim between meetings of the Council.

The restructuring process in 2020 changed up the leadership structure of the organization. Shayan Rauf and Sai Suhas Kopparapu are the current Co-Presidents of the organization. 

The Ivy Council also strives to cultivate and support future leaders in business, politics, academia, tech, and more of the United States of America and the world. It supports a holistic program in leadership training across diverse domains and active mentorship. Members of the Ivy Council have gone on to become members of the U.S. Senate and leaders of national non-profits.

Controversies 
In 2005, member institutions of the Ivy Council withdrew from the organization due to a lack of organization. Some member institutions also expressed lackluster interest in the Ivy Council, with minimal participation in the conferences.

References 

Ivy League
Groups of students' unions
Student political organizations in the United States